Chang Ho-chirl (born January 12, 1962) is a South Korean singer who started his career in Taiwan.

Chang went to Taiwan in 1982 to study literature at Chinese Culture University. After graduation, he studied at National Taiwan University for a master's degree in political science. That's when he started his singing career, with his first album in 1988.

He had since released 11 Mandopop albums in Taiwan, and 4 albums in South Korea (1 in Mandarin, 2 in Korean and 1 in English).

References

20th-century South Korean male singers
1962 births
Korean Mandopop singers
South Korean expatriates in Taiwan
People from Seoul
National Taiwan University alumni
Chinese Culture University alumni
Living people
21st-century South Korean male singers